The Battle of Kismayo (2009) erupted on 1 October 2009, after the Islamist alliance occupying Kismayo, Somalia broke down. Sheikh Ahmed "Madobe" and his Raskamboni Brigade forces attempted to expel al-Shabaab from the city, but were overpowered, resulting in an al-Shabaab takeover of Kismayo.

References

Kismayo 2009
2009 in Somalia
October 2009 events in Africa
Kismayo